"Bess, You Is My Woman Now" is a duet with music by George Gershwin and lyrics by Ira Gershwin and DuBose Heyward. This song comes from the Gershwins' opera Porgy and Bess (1935) where it is sung by the main character Porgy and his beloved Bess. They express their love for each other and say that they now belong together.

The song has been covered a number of times by many artists (Porgy and Bess (Ella Fitzgerald and Louis Armstrong album), 1958). In 1959, Harry Belafonte recorded a duet with Lena Horne on their album Porgy and Bess. In 1954 Harry James released a version on his album Trumpet After Midnight (Columbia CL-553). Barbra Streisand recorded this song on her The Broadway Album from 1985, named "I Loves You, Porgy/Porgy, I's Your Woman Now (Bess, You Is My Woman Now)".

1935 songs
Songs from Porgy and Bess
Songs with lyrics by Ira Gershwin